The Army Public School, Mhow is a public school located at Dr. Ambedkar Nagar operated by the Indian Army supervision under the aegis of Army Welfare Education Society (AWES). The school is situated at 44 Mall Road. It is one of the most prominent Army Schools, ranking among the top three Army Public Schools and top ten in India. In 2012 Dr APJ Abdul Kalam visited the school and inaugurated the new Abdul Kalam block and had an interactive session with the students.

Administrative staff
 Principal: Mr. P.K. Tiwari 
 Vice principal: Mr. Sudhir Chaudhary
Senior wing Coordinator: Mr. Shailendra Sharma
Junior wing Coordinator: Mrs. Molly Alex

Departments and their heads
HOD Hindi: Mr. Rajiv Kumar
HOD Mathematics: Mr. Vikrant Dawesar
HOD Biology: Mr. Vijay Sharma
HOD Physics: Mr. S. Chaudhary
HOD Chemistry: Mrs. S. Dogra
HOD English: Mrs. Roshni Modi
HOD Social Science: Mr. K. Raman
HOD Music: Mrs. Preeti Nagar

Structure
The building was constructed as a Military Hospital at Mhow in 1866, under the British Army. In 1953, it was appropriated as the All Arms Wing of the Army Signal Training School. It later housed the Headquarters of the Army Training Command (HQ ARTRAC) from 1991 to 1994. When ARTRAC moved to Shimla, the Army School at Mhow (now Army Public School)  was then housed in this magnificent heritage building, since 1994, and still functions from there, till date. The Army decided to demolish this heritage structure, on the grounds that its general maintenance is too expensive to sustain. However, as a structure, it has stood the test of time since the last 152 years and will certainly remain structurally strong for at least another century, if not more. It was declared a heritage structure several years ago, but has come up for demolition in the near future. In fact, over the years, crores of Rupees have been spent, in order to keep the building in its pristine glory. Its hard to imagine why the order for its demolition came up at all. Interestingly, at the main gate entrance to the school, a large hoarding proudly displayed the historical significance and the ‘heritage tag’ of the school building.

Aim

To transform students into Confident, Refined, Responsible, Resourceful and Well Educated individuals with emphasis on achieving all round personality development through series of structured curricular and co-curricular activities.

Affiliation

Central Board of Secondary Education. Affiliation No. 1030020

Streams

Science, Commerce & Humanities (XI & XII)

Magazines and publications
Students publish an annual magazine called Pratham Kiran. The magazine contains articles on various school events of the past year, from students of all standards. The editorial section of the magazine includes literary works and contribution by the students in Hindi and English.The magazine also features the achievements and accolades received by students and school staff in the past year.

Infrastructure
The school has one of the oldest yet very well maintained British-like arched building. The campus has lush green surroundings and latest laboratory equipment's. The  campus stands on a sprawling 100-acre site. Currently new building is being constructed on schools football Ground and new alternative for the football ground is yet to be decided.

External links
Army School, Mhow Website

Sports Team
Army Public School Mhow excelled in the local and cluster football tournaments for three successive. The school also had notable successes in basketball. The football team got the 1st position in Inter Army School Football Tournament held at APS, Danapur, where Shivam Parihar won best player of the tournament. Volleyball team won one of the oldest volleyball tournament of MP organised by builder memorial Church twice.

1983 establishments in Madhya Pradesh
Indian Army Public Schools
Educational institutions established in 1983
High schools and secondary schools in Madhya Pradesh
Education in Mhow